The white-bellied pitohui (Pseudorectes incertus) is a species of bird in the family Pachycephalidae.
It is found throughout the lowlands of southern New Guinea (Lorentz River to upper Fly River.

Taxonomy and systematics
The white-bellied pitohui was originally described in the genus Pitohui until moved to Pseudorectes by the IOC in 2013. Alternatively, some other authorities classify the white-bellied pitohui in the genus Colluricincla. Alternate names for the white-bellied pitohui include the brown pitohui, mottle-breasted pitohui, mottled pitohui and white-bellied shrike-thrush.

Distribution and habitat
Its natural habitats are subtropical or tropical moist lowland forests and subtropical or tropical swamps.
It is threatened by habitat loss.

References

white-bellied pitohui
white-bellied pitohui
white-bellied pitohui
Taxonomy articles created by Polbot